Sciaenochromis fryeri is a species of cichlid endemic to Lake Malawi where it is found along the rocky coastal areas at depths of .  It can reach a length of  SL. The specific name honours Geoffrey Fryer (b.1927) who was Fisheries Research Officer, Joint Fisheries Research Organisation of Northern Rhodesia and Nyasaland.

References

Sciaenochromis
Fish of Malawi
Taxa named by Ad Konings
Fish described in 1993
Taxonomy articles created by Polbot
Fish of Lake Malawi